New York Confidential is a British-American crime drama series that aired from 1958 to 1959.

The series aired in syndicated in the United States and was broadcast on London's local ITV station, Associated-Rediffusion, in the UK.  It was co-produced by ITC Entertainment, Metropolis Productions, Inc., and Television Programs of America.

Overview
Running for 39 half-hour monochrome episodes, the series chronicled the adventures of a New York City newspaper columnist Lee Cochran, played by Lee Tracy.

The series is often mis-remembered today as having flowed from a 1955 Broderick Crawford movie of the same name.  However, neither Lee Cochran, nor any newspaper columnist, features in the film.  In truth, the two works were unrelated attempts to adapt the same novel by Jack Lait and Lee Mortimer, with varying degrees of fidelity to that source.  The film is frequently cited as being merely "suggested" by the book, whereas the television series is seen as being "based upon" it.

Episode list

References

External links
 
 Classic TV Archive information

1958 American television series debuts
1959 American television series endings
1958 British television series debuts
1959 British television series endings
1950s American crime drama television series
1950s British drama television series
Black-and-white British television shows
English-language television shows
First-run syndicated television programs in the United States
Television series by ITC Entertainment